Hyatt Regency San Francisco is a hotel located at the foot of Market Street and The Embarcadero in the financial district of San Francisco, California. The hotel is a part of the Embarcadero Center development by Trammell Crow, David Rockefeller, and John Portman.

The San Francisco Chronicle's architecture critic John King has described the 1973 building as a "temple of hermetic urbanism" in a "self-contained sci-fi" style that by 2016 had become "dated", albeit remaining "still visually dazzling, in a futuristic sort of way." The Regency Club Lounge was once the Equinox, a rooftop revolving restaurant, but is now a stationary elite club for certain hotel guests offering 360-degree views of the city and the bay. The atrium holds the Guinness world record (as of 2012) for the largest hotel lobby, with a length of 107 meters, width of 49 meters and height of 52 meters (15 stories).

Ownership history
In December 2013, the hotel was purchased by Aliso-Viejo, CA-based Sunstone Hotel Investors, Inc., for $262M.

In popular culture
The Hyatt Regency's atrium lobby served as the lobby of the Glass Tower in 1974's The Towering Inferno. Replicas of John Portman's trademark pill-shaped elevators were built for use in the film and are featured throughout, including in an extended sequence where one is lifted from the stricken tower by helicopter. The hotel was also featured in the 1977 Mel Brooks Comedy High Anxiety, the film Telefon from 1977, and in Time After Time, a tale of H.G. Wells chasing Jack The Ripper into the future of 1979.

As well as being a setting for numerous films, the lobby is itself inspired by a film. Architect John Portman has stated that its design was suggested to him by viewing the 1935 science fiction film Things to Come.

References

Further reading

External links

 Hyatt Regency San Francisco official website

Skyscraper hotels in San Francisco
Hyatt Hotels and Resorts
Market Street (San Francisco)
Hotel buildings completed in 1973
Hotels established in 1973
John C. Portman Jr. buildings
Modernist architecture in California